Cladoxycanus is a monotypic genus of moths belonging to the family Hepialidae. It consists of only one species, Cladoxycanus minos, which is endemic to New Zealand. C. minos was first described by George Hudson in 1905.

References

External links

 Hepialidae genera

Hepialidae
Moths of New Zealand
Monotypic moth genera
Taxa named by Lionel Jack Dumbleton
Endemic fauna of New Zealand
Exoporia genera
Endemic moths of New Zealand